The John Molson School of Business, commonly known as John Molson, is a business school located in Montreal, Quebec, Canada. The John Molson School of Business was established in 1974 by Concordia University.

Programs

Undergraduate programs
Bachelor of Business Administration (BAdmin)
Bachelor of Commerce (BComm)

Graduate diploma programs
Business Administration (GDBA)
Chartered Accountancy (CPA)

Graduate certificate programs
Business Administration (GCBA)
Quantitative Business Studies (GCQBS)

Postgraduate programs
Master of Science in Management (MSc)
Master of Science in Marketing (MSc)
Master of Science in Finance (MSc)
Master of Supply Chain Management (MSCM)
Full-time/part-time MBA
MBA in Investment Management
Executive MBA (EMBA)
PhD in Business Administration

Executive education 

 Sustainable Investment Certificate
 Aviation Certificate
 Coaching Certification

Student life
The John Molson School of Business has a very large community of student-run clubs and events. The Commerce and Administration Students' Association (CASAJMSB) represents the undergraduate students at John Molson and oversees 15 clubs comprising over 200 student volunteers. The John Molson Graduate Students' Association (JMGSA) represents graduate students.

The Goodman Institute of Investment Management
The MBA in Investment Management offered by the Goodman Institute of Investment Management was established in 2001 following a gift from Ned Goodman. The Goodman Institute's MBA in Investment Management Program is the world's only MBA program that fully integrates the curriculum of the CFA Charter into its program. This combined curriculum permits students to study towards two world-recognized designations simultaneously, and is offered in Montreal while providing networking opportunities in Toronto. Classes are given Wednesday evenings and Saturdays to allow students to work full-time while earning the MBA and CFA.

Case competitions
Both undergraduate and graduate students are active participants in international business case competitions. The school also hosts two of its own competitions: the John Molson Undergraduate Case Competition and the John Molson MBA International Case Competition.

Kenneth Woods Portfolio Management Program 
A selected group of undergraduate students manage a $3.4 million endowment portfolio every year as part of the Kenneth Woods Portfolio Management Program (KWPMP). The portfolio was donated by Ken Woods in 2000 for the primary purpose of training undergraduate students in investment management.

Van Berkom Investment Management Program 
The Van Berkom Investment Management Program (VBIMP) was established in 2015 after a donation by J. Sebastian van Berkom. Each year, the program's eight manage a portfolio of small capitalized North American equities with a view to achieving above-average returns.

Rankings 
CEO MAGAZINE

 #3 in Canada, #33 in world, John Molson EMBA, 2021 Global MBA Rankings.

BLOOMBERG BUSINESSWEEK

 #1 in Quebec, #4 in Canada, #1 for entrepreneurship, John Molson MBA, Best B-Schools 2020-21.

THE ECONOMIST

 #4 in Canada, John Molson EMBA, Which MBA, 2021.
QS GLOBAL EXECUTIVE MBA RANKINGS
Top 100 in world, John Molson EMBA, QS Global Executive MBA Rankings 2020.
QS GLOBAL MBA RANKINGS
Top 3 in Canada for ROI, John Molson MBA, Global MBA Rankings 2021.
CORPORATE KNIGHTS
 Top 25 in world, Sustainable Business Schools, John Molson MBA, 2019 Better World MBA Ranking.

Name origin

The John Molson School of Business is named after businessman John Molson who was an entrepreneur in Canada during the late 18th century and early 19th century after having emigrated from England. Shortly after his arrival, at the age of 23, he founded the Molson Brewing Company, which is North America's oldest brewery.

Concordia University renamed its Faculty of Commerce and Administration after John Molson in November 2000 following a $20 million donation by the Molson family towards the construction of the new John Molson Building.

See also
Education in Canada
Rankings of universities in Canada

References

Further reading
Bissonette, L. A. "Loyola of Montreal: A Sociological Analysis of an Educational Institution in Transition between 1969 and 1974." M.A. thesis, Concordia University, 1977.

External links

 John Molson School of Business

Concordia University
Business schools in Canada
1974 establishments in Canada
Downtown Montreal